The Owens sucker (Catostomus fumeiventris) is a fish in the family Catostomidae which is endemic to California.

Description
The Owens sucker is similar to the Tahoe sucker (Catostomus tahoensis) but it has coarser scales and is duller in colour. The adults are slaty coloured, although some individuals can be very dark, with dusky bellies which are especially noticeable in spawning males. It grows to a maximum size of 50 cm but is more usually around 30 cm in total length.

Distribution
It is endemic to the Owens River in the Owens Valley of eastern California and has been introduced into June Lake in the Mono Lake basin and to the Santa Clara River system as a result of a release of water from the Owens River through the Los Angeles Aqueduct. Although the status of the population in the Santa Clara system is uncertain and any introduced fish may hybridise with the Santa Ana sucker (Catostomus santaanae). It is abundant in the Crowley Lake with populations in Convict Lake and Lake Sabrina and a population has been established in the Owens River sanctuary.

Habitat
Owens suckers are primarily found on the softer substrates in cool streams but they will be demersal inhabitants lakes and reservoirs.

Biology
Owens suckers are nocturnal, their diet consists of aquatic insects, algae, detritus, and organic matter. They spawn from May through to early July over gravel substrates, in tributaries, although lake living populations will also spawn over gravelly areas of the lake beds and springs. The larvae become juveniles once the attain a total length of 19–22 mm, the juveniles hide along stream margins and in backwaters among weeds.

References

Owens sucker
Endemic fauna of California
Fish of the Western United States
Freshwater fish of the United States
Fauna of the Great Basin
Owens River
Owens Valley
Natural history of Inyo County, California
Fish described in 1973